Egne hjem was an Oslo Metro and Oslo Tramway station on the Kolsås Line located in Bærum, Norway. The station was situated between Ringstabekk and Bekkestua,  from Stortinget.

The station was opened on 3 November 1924. Owing to the low number of passengers and poor location, the station was not reopened following the upgrade of the Kolsås Line.

References

Official document about plans to upgrade Kolsåsbanen (.doc file, Norwegian)
Table over the western T-bane stations

Oslo Metro stations in Bærum
Oslo Tramway stations in Bærum
Railway stations opened in 1924
Railway stations closed in 2006
Disused Oslo Metro stations
1924 establishments in Norway
2006 disestablishments in Norway